The Tanyurer is a river in Chukotka in Russia, a left tributary of the Anadyr.

The whole basin of the Tanyurer and its tributaries belongs to the Chukotka Autonomous Okrug.

Course
It flows roughly southwards from the Pekulney Range of the Chukotka Mountains and passes through the sparsely populated areas of Chukotka. This river meets the Anadyr in the lower stretch of its course, being the last large tributary of the Anadyr.

See also
List of rivers of Russia

References

External links
 Ice extent in the Tanyurer River Valley 
  

Rivers of Chukotka Autonomous Okrug
Chukotka Mountains